Paul Mayeda Berges (born September 11, 1968) is an American screenwriter and director, notably as co-writer of 2002's Bend It Like Beckham.

Of Japanese and Basque ancestry, Berges attended the University of California, Santa Cruz, where he studied film and graduated in 1990. He began his career by making documentaries (on the Japanese American community) and teaching film production (to high school students). He has collaborated with his wife, British-Indian director Gurinder Chadha, on a number of films and made his directorial debut in 2005 with The Mistress of Spices, based on the novel by Chitra Banerjee Divakaruni.

Berges officially met Chadha in March 1994, while he was working as a festival director at the San Francisco Asian American International Film Festival. They had also briefly met in September 1993. They married in the mid-nineties and have twins together; a boy named Ronak and a girl named Kumiko (born June 7, 2007).

Filmography

References

External links

 
 BBC Movies: Interview – Paul Mayeda Berges (April 2006)
 Birmingham Mail: Film Reviews – Film: Gurinder Chadha reveals how marriage and babies were written in her stars (April 23, 2010)
 Culture.com: Bend It Like Beckham – About The Filmmakers
 Filmmaker GURINDER CHADHA: Could She 'Bend It' Without A British Accent?
 RS Bollywood Online: Premier Indian Film Portal – Gurinder Chadha gives birth to twins (June 9, 2007)
 The Writing Studio: The art of writing and making films – THE MISTRESS OF SPICES (Paul Mayeda Berges – Director/Writer)
 Toronto International Film Festival

1968 births
Living people
University of California, Santa Cruz alumni
American male screenwriters
Film producers from California
Film directors from California
American film directors of Japanese descent
American people of Basque descent
People from Torrance, California
Screenwriters from California